Okraina is the name of two films.
 Okraina (1933 film), a Soviet film by Boris Barnet
 Okraina (1998 film), a Russian film by Pyotr Lutsik, loosely based on the 1933 film

Ukraina may also refer to
 Ukraina, Polish name for the country Ukraine
 Ukraina, Łódź Voivodeship, a village in central Poland

See also
Eastern Okraina